Carlo Zendo Tetsugen Serra (born in Milano, Italy in 1953) is an Italian missionary Soto Zen master  (Kokusaifukyoshi 国際布教師), in the lineage of Harada Daiun Sogaku (原田祖岳, 1871–1961).
He founded his sangha, of the "Sangha della foresta di Bambü" (Bamboo Forest's Sangha) and the monasteries  Ensoji il Cerchio in Milan, and Sanbo-ji Tempio dei Tre Gioielli in Berceto.
He also founded the "Scuola Zen di Shiatsu" (Zen Shiatsu School), that aims to use the art of shiatsu treatments as a zen practice.
He is one of the buddhist religious authorities in Europe signator of the interreligious Italian "Manifesto della pace" (Peace Manifesto).

Biography
After a short career in the world of photography and cinema, Carlo Serra arrives in Japan in 1983, and is ordained monk  (出家 shukke), with the Dharma name (戒名, kaimyō) Tetsugen, at the Tosho-ji (東照寺) monkery of Tokyo. He became disciple of the abbot  Ban Tetsugyu Soin Roshi (伴鐵牛, 1910–1996).

During his training of monk, he attended the Institute of eastern medicine founded by Shizuto Masunaga (増永静人 1925–1981), from which, in 1988, he got a certificate of teacher of eastern medicine and Zen Shiatsu. The composite background of zen monk and shiatsu teacher opened to Tetsugen his intention to use the shiatsu discipline as zen practice, that will become one of particularity of his work in Italy.

After five years training in Toshoji, Tetsugen was sent as a buddhist missionary in Italy, and in 1988 grounded the first monastery in Milan, Enso-ji il Cerchio. In 1992 had birth also the Shiatsu Zen school ("Scuola Zen di Shiatsu"). In 1995 follows the beginning, even in Enso-ji, of the offering of shiatsu massage, which permitted to monks and shiatsu teachers to use and improve the abilities apprehended in the training, making a job of that.

A year later a second monastery is founded, the Sanbo-ji, tempio dei tre Gioielli (temple of three jewels) nearby Berceto, Parma. Initially used for location for zen retreats and shiatsu seminaries, in the last years Sanbo-ji becomes seat of a monastic "Sangha", that opened to the lay people also to practise a monk's daily life for a short time.

In 1998 the zen master Tetsujyo Deguchi (出口鐵城, 1951), dharma heir of  Ban Tetsugyu Soin (伴鐵牛, 1910–1996) and current abbot of Sanbo-ji certificates to Tetsugen the Dharma transmission of his lineage, recognizing him as missionary zen master (Kokusaifukyoshi 国際布教師) with the name of Zendo. The confirmation of this title accompanied the acknowledgement of Tetsugen as independent master by the international association "Sōtōshū shumucho" (曹洞宗宗務庁), to which belong many of the Soto temples and monasteries in Japan and in the World. Between 2000 and 2003, Tetsugen covered the seat of member of the direction of UBI (Italian Buddhist Union).

The first years of 21st Century saw a gradual evolution of the approach of Tetsugen's doctrine, that began to put the basis for a new development of zen teaching and practising that could transfer the meanings of buddhist and zen tradition following the demands and the languages of the western society. The Italian zen master tested also an approach to management of the zen discipline of koan solving creating in 2003 the society "ZenEssere" (ZenBeing), deeping a theoretical path that took him to publish, for the publishing house Guerini Management by Zen Koan, in which he develops an application of Zen teaching to management.

The work of Tetsugen Serra spreads itself also to experimentations that make from Zen teaching and cognitive psychology a lay path of self-improvement with the offering of counseling sessions, helping to solve daily problems about the attitude to life. In 2012 Tetsugen finishes to perfect the path of consciousness development named MindfulZen, that through sessions of meetings, seminars and appropriate essays achieve the Italian master's intention to build a path to mindfulness from zen teachings in a lay a contemporary way.

Sources

Bibliography
In Italian

 Carlo Tetsugen Serra, Zen 3.0. La via della meditazione. Milano, Cairo, 2015.
 Carlo Tetsugen Serra, Zen 2.0. La via della felicità. Milano, Cairo, 2014.
 Stefano Verza, Carlo Tetsugen Serra, Management by Zen Koan, Guerini, 2009.
 Carlo Tetsugen Serra, Zen Shiatsu. Per sé, per la coppia, per gli amici e la famiglia Milano, Fabbri Editori, 2005
 Carlo Tetsugen Serra, Zen. Milano, Fabbri Editori, 2005.
 Carlo Tetsugen Serra,  La Terapia Zen, Como, Xenia, 1998
 Carlo Tetsugen Serra, Vivere zen. Como, Xenia, 1998.
In Spanish

Carlo Tetsugen Serra Zen Shiatsu para uno mismo Tutor, 2013

External links 
Tosho-ji's official site
Italian Buddhist monks
Buddhist spiritual teachers
Italian Buddhist missionaries
Zen Buddhist monks
Italian Buddhists
Converts to Buddhism
Living people
1953 births